Gdańsk Power Station is a combined heat and power station in Gdańsk, Poland. It is operated by PGE Energia Ciepła Oddział Wybrzeże, a subsidiary of PGE.

The power station has 5 power generation units and 2 boilers without electricity generation. The parameters of these installations are:

References

Energy infrastructure completed in 1970
Coal-fired power stations in Poland
Cogeneration power stations in Poland
Électricité de France
Buildings and structures in Gdańsk